Jennifer Mayani is an Indian-Chilean model and Bollywood film actress. She made her career in 2005 with the Hindi film Dus. She is of Sindhi origin.

Filmography 
2005 Dus
2007 Good Boy, Bad Boy as Jenny
2007 Heyy Babyy as Supermarket Girl
2007 Om Shanti Om
2007 Jaane Bhi Do Yaaron
2008 Bhram as Model 3
2009 Victory
2010 Apartment as Item Girl
2010 Golmaal 3

References

External links
 
 

Actresses in Hindi cinema
Chilean people of Indian descent
Indian film actresses
Actresses from Mumbai
Living people
Year of birth missing (living people)
Chilean people of Sindhi descent
Sindhi people